Thomas Hamilton PC (Ire) (28 August 1842 – 18 May 1926) was a Northern Ireland clergyman and academician who served as president of Queen's College, Belfast and subsequently Vice-Chancellor of the Queen's University of Belfast after its creation in 1908.

A native of Belfast, Hamilton was educated at the Royal Belfast Academical Institution, Queen's College, Belfast and Queen's University of Ireland. He became president of Queens College, Belfast in 1889 and, after nineteen years in that position, was appointed to the office of vice-chancellor when the expanded institution was granted university status. He served in this post for another fifteen years, until 1923.  He was also the author of a number of historical and ecclesiastical studies, including the 1886 History of the Irish Presbyterian Church, and wrote myriad entries for the Dictionary of National Biography.  As a prominent unionist, he was appointed, at the age of 78, to the Privy Council of Ireland in the 1921 New Year Honours, entitling him to the style "The Right Honourable".

He was awarded an honorary Doctor of Divinity degree by the University of Aberdeen, and an honorary Doctor of Laws degree by the Royal University of Ireland, of which he had been a Senator for many years.

In 1876, Hamilton married Frances Allen (died 4 May 1925) and was the father of a son and two daughters. He died in Belfast at the age of 83.

References

External links
Thomas Hamilton entry in the Dictionary of Ulster Biography
McMahon, Timothy G. "'All creeda and all classes'? Just who made up the Gaelic League?", Journal of Irish Studies, Fall-Winter, 2002
Description of the institutional archive of Queen's College Belfast which includes collections of papers and memorabilia of the Rev. Thomas Hamilton (the year of death is erroneously indicated as 1925)
"Gregson joins distinguished list of academics − a history of Queen's Vice-Chancellors" (9 January 2004 Queen's University Belfast press release)
 

1842 births
1926 deaths
Educators from Northern Ireland
Historians from Northern Ireland
People educated at the Royal Belfast Academical Institution
Academics of Queen's University Belfast
Vice-Chancellors of Queen's University Belfast
Members of the Privy Council of Ireland
Clergy from Belfast
Presbyterian ministers from Northern Ireland
Male writers from Northern Ireland